The men's 80 kg competition in Taekwondo at the 2020 Summer Olympics was held on 26 July 2021, at the Makuhari Messe Hall A.

Competition format
The main bracket consisted of a single elimination tournament, culminating in the gold medal match. The top eight athletes in each event were seeded so as not to face each other in the preliminary round. The remainder of the qualified athletes were drawn randomly. Two bronze medals were awarded at the Taekwondo competitions.  A repechage was used to determine the bronze medal winners. Every competitor who lost to one of the two finalists competed in the repechage, another single-elimination competition. Each semifinal loser faced the last remaining repechage competitor from the opposite half of the bracket in a bronze medal match.

Schedule 
All times are in local time (UTC+9).

Results

Main bracket

Repechage

References

External links
Draw 

Men's 80 kg
Men's events at the 2020 Summer Olympics